The Pakistan national under-17 football team is the under-17 football (soccer) team of Pakistan. The team has participated in the AFC U-16 Championship once in 2002 and has also participated in the SAFF U-16 Championship in 2011 and 2013, but withdrew in 2015 and did not enter in 2017.

Competition records

AFC U-16 Championship record

SAFF U-16 Championship

Players and management

U-16 last squad
 The 23-man squad was call-up for the XIII South Asian Games And XXI Commonwealth Games

Coaching staff

See also
 Pakistan national football team
 Pakistan national under-23 football team
 Pakistan national under-20 football team

References 

under-17
Asian national under-17 association football teams